In geometry, the cubitruncated cuboctahedron or cuboctatruncated cuboctahedron is a nonconvex uniform polyhedron, indexed as U16. It has 20 faces (8 hexagons, 6 octagons, and 6 octagrams), 72 edges, and 48 vertices, and has a shäfli symbol of tr{4,3/2}

Convex hull 

Its convex hull is a nonuniform truncated cuboctahedron.

Orthogonal projection

Cartesian coordinates 
Cartesian coordinates for the vertices of a cubitruncated cuboctahedron are all the permutations of

 (±(−1), ±1, ±(+1))

Related polyhedra

Tetradyakis hexahedron

The tetradyakis hexahedron (or great disdyakis dodecahedron) is a nonconvex isohedral polyhedron. It has 48 intersecting scalene triangle faces, 72 edges, and 20 vertices.

Proportions 
The dihedral angle equals . Part of each triangle lies within the solid, hence is invisible in solid models.

It is the dual of the uniform cubitruncated cuboctahedron.

See also 
 List of uniform polyhedra

References

 p. 92

External links 
 
 
 http://gratrix.net Uniform polyhedra and duals

Uniform polyhedra